John Mark Galecki (born April 30, 1975) is an American actor. He played Leonard Hofstadter in the CBS sitcom The Big Bang Theory (2007–2019) for which he received a Primetime Emmy Award nomination, and David Healy in the ABC sitcoms Roseanne (1992–1997; 2018) and The Conners (2018–2019). Galecki also appeared in the films National Lampoon's Christmas Vacation (1989), Prancer (1989), Suicide Kings (1997), I Know What You Did Last Summer (1997), Bookies (2003), In Time (2011), and Rings (2017).

Galecki was one of the highest paid television actors in the world, with his role in The Big Bang Theory earning him approximately US$900,000 per episode between 2017 and 2019. In 2018, he was estimated to be the world's second highest-paid male TV actor by Forbes (behind only his The Big Bang Theory co-star Jim Parsons), earning $25 million.

Early life
Galecki was born in Bree, Limburg, Belgium to American parents of Polish, Irish, and Italian descent. His mother, Mary Louise (Mary Lou) Noon, was a mortgage consultant, and his father, Richard Galecki, was a member of the U.S. Air Force stationed in Belgium and worked as a rehabilitation teacher. Galecki is the eldest of three children with a sister, Allison, and a brother, Nick, whom he describes as a "mechanical genius" in the automotive industry. Galecki grew up in Oak Park, Illinois. He dropped out of school after 8th grade, attending high school for only one day.

During an interview with New Zealand radio station ZM, Galecki recalled his childhood relationship with his mother. As a child, he was well known for making up long stories and tales. In such situations, his mother used to make him play the "quiet game", where he had to see how long he could go without talking. He also recalled that despite being a loving mother, she was also very tough. One phrase she would lovingly use was, "I love you, now get out."

Career

After working in the Chicago theatre scene as a young child, Galecki made his onscreen acting debut in the 1987 CBS miniseries Murder Ordained with JoBeth Williams and future Roseanne co-star John Goodman. In 1989, Galecki portrayed Rusty Griswold in National Lampoon's Christmas Vacation. In 1990, he was cast as Danny Nash, the son of Robert Urich's lead character, on the NBC comedy American Dreamer; the following season, he was a regular cast member on the ABC sitcom Billy, a spin-off from Head of the Class. He appeared in one episode of Blossom in 1991, opposite his future The Big Bang Theory co-star Mayim Bialik. He played a young delinquent in A Family Torn Apart, a 1993 TV movie based on a true story about a serial killer.

During his run on Billy, Galecki began making guest appearances on the hit ABC sitcom Roseanne as the younger brother of Mark Healy (Glenn Quinn), who began a relationship with Darlene Conner (Sara Gilbert). Introduced in his first appearance as Kevin Healy, his name was soon changed to David. After a few more guest shots, Galecki was named a permanent Roseanne cast member from the fall of 1992 onward, after the cancellation of Billy. He would remain in the role of David Healy until the end of Roseanne'''s run in 1997, with the character eventually marrying Darlene and fathering two children with her. Galecki's character on The Big Bang Theory would also have a short-lived relationship with Gilbert's character on the same show.

Galecki also appeared in the 1995 music video for the Dave Matthews Band song "Satellite".

After Roseanne ended, Galecki had small roles in a string of films, including the 1997 summer slasher film I Know What You Did Last Summer (as the killer's first victim),  Bean (1997), The Opposite of Sex (1998), Bounce (2000) and Vanilla Sky (2001). He had larger roles in the 1997 film Suicide Kings and the 2003 film Bookies, a comedy thriller film about four college students. Galecki appeared as a golfer in a 2005 episode of My Name Is Earl entitled "Stole Beer from a Golfer".

In 2005, Galecki played Mark Corrigan in a pilot for a US adaptation of the British sitcom Peep Show. He played a character named Trouty on TBS's sitcom My Boys, and the half-brother of the main characters, sisters Hope Shanowski and Faith Fairfield, in the sitcom Hope & Faith. Galecki originated the role of Alex, a male prostitute, in the play The Little Dog Laughed by Douglas Carter Beane, in 2006 at Second Stage Theater. He stayed in the role for the play's Broadway run at the Cort Theatre in late 2006 and early 2007. Galecki said at the time, "At its core, the play is about what we all sacrifice to be successful, whatever our careers or goals." The play was a commercial and critical success, and Galecki won a 2007 Theater World Award for his performance.

Galecki played Leonard Hofstadter in the CBS sitcom The Big Bang Theory, which ran from 2007 to 2019 and was, for most of its run, among the top three most popular television comedies in the US. Galecki was originally asked to play the role of Sheldon Cooper, but he felt he was better suited for the role of Leonard, and Sheldon's role was eventually given to Jim Parsons. During the show's run, two of Galecki's former Roseanne co-stars appeared on the show: Sara Gilbert (as Leslie Winkle, Leonard's colleague) and Laurie Metcalf (as Mary Cooper, Sheldon's mother). Galecki is a cellist, a talent that was used on the show. Until 2013, Galecki and his Big Bang co-stars Kaley Cuoco and Jim Parsons each earned US$325,000 per episode. By 2014, the three were earning US$1 million per episode.

Galecki appeared briefly in the 2008 superhero comedy Hancock, alongside Will Smith and Jason Bateman. In July 2011, he played a parody version of himself in three episodes of Entourage. He also appeared in the film In Time (2011) with Justin Timberlake and Amanda Seyfried.

Galecki appeared in one episode of the 2018 revival of Roseanne on ABC. The show, despite its high ratings, was cancelled after Roseanne Barr posted a racist and controversial tweet about Valerie Jarrett. Roseanne was replaced by a new program, The Conners, which premiered in October 2018 and featured the same cast without Barr. Galecki has occasionally appeared as David on The Conners.

Personal life
As a teenager, Galecki dated his Roseanne (and later The Big Bang Theory) co-star Sara Gilbert (their characters also dated). During their relationship, Gilbert realized she was a lesbian. They remain close friends.

While working on The Big Bang Theory, Galecki dated co-star Kaley Cuoco for about two years until December 2009 while the two also played a couple on the show. Cuoco told CBS Watch'' that they have remained on good terms since ending their relationship.

Galecki owns 360 acres of land in Santa Margarita, California. His property included vineyards and a log cabin.  In late June 2017, Galecki's ranch was destroyed in a major wildfire known as the Hill Fire. Galecki, in a media statement, said wildfire was "the threat ... we live with constantly, which may seem crazy to some but we do so because living in our beautiful, rural area makes it worthwhile".

In August 2018, Galecki started dating Alaina Meyer. Their son, Avery, was born in November 2019. In November 2020, it was reported that Galecki and Meyer had separated.

Filmography

Film

Television

Music videos

Awards and nominations

References

External links

 
 Playbill article about the end of ''The Little Dog Laughed'''s run at The Cort Theatre
 Movieline interview with Johnny Galecki

1975 births
Living people
20th-century American male actors
21st-century American male actors
American male child actors
American male film actors
American male comedy actors
American male television actors
Actors from Oak Park, Illinois
Male actors from Illinois
People from Bree, Belgium
Theatre World Award winners